Miles Barne may refer to:

 Miles Barne (theologian), English theologian, Fellow of Peterhouse, Cambridge, member of the Chapel Royal, non-juror after the Glorious Revolution
 Miles Barne (politician born 1718) (1718–1780), MP for Dunwich 1747–54 and 1762–77
 Miles Barne (politician born 1746) (1746–1825), MP for Dunwich 1791–96

See also 
 Barne